Sami Kennedy-Sim (born 26 May 1988) is an Australian freestyle skier currently living in Manly, New South Wales.

Skiing career
After two podium finishes on the Ski Cross Europa Cup circuit, Kennedy-Sim made her debut on the FIS Freestyle Skiing World Cups in Deer Valley Resort, USA in 2008 finishing 20th. Kennedy-Sim has been competing on the FIS Freestyle Skiing World Cup tour for three years placing in the top 5 on the World Cup tour. In 2011, she competed at the FIS Freestyle World Ski Championships. Kennedy-Sim, finished her 2012 season being ranked 12th in the world. She competed for Australia at the 2014 Winter Olympics in the ski cross events.

Sami married Cross Country Olympian Ben Sim in April 2011. Before the 2014 Winter Olympics in Sochi, she survived a stroke.

Kennedy-Sim had an eighth place finish at the 2022 Winter Olympics and was named as Australia's flagbearer during the closing ceremony.

References

External links

 http://samikennedysim.com/blog
Olympic Winter Institute
 http://www.theaustralian.com.au/sport/sami-kennedy-sim-was-in-shock-when-told-shed-had-a-stroke/story-e6frg7mf-1226765606549

1988 births
Australian female freestyle skiers
Freestyle skiers at the 2014 Winter Olympics
Freestyle skiers at the 2018 Winter Olympics
Freestyle skiers at the 2022 Winter Olympics
Living people
Olympic freestyle skiers of Australia
Skiers from Sydney
Sportswomen from New South Wales